The enzyme sabinene-hydrate synthase (EC 4.2.3.11) catalyzes the chemical reaction

geranyl diphosphate + H2O  sabinene hydrate + diphosphate

This enzyme belongs to the family of lyases, specifically those carbon-oxygen lyases acting on phosphates.  The systematic name of this enzyme class is geranyl-diphosphate diphosphate-lyase (cyclizing, sabinene-hydrate-forming). This enzyme is also called sabinene hydrate cyclase.  This enzyme participates in monoterpenoid biosynthesis.

References

 
 

EC 4.2.3
Enzymes of unknown structure